Wasyl Ciapiński (1540s in Vitebsk Voivodeship – c. 1604) was a Belarusian-Lithuanian noble, humanist, educator, writer, publisher and translator from the Grand Duchy of Lithuania known for translating the Bible into the Belarusian language. He was behind the printing of the "Moscow Gospel" in the 1570s, and is regarded as one of the early facilitators of Belarusian printed literature. His Bible is sometimes understood to have been printed in Ukrainian but is today generally regarded as Belarusian language.

External links
Szlachta ruska Wielkiego Księstwa Litewskiego a reformacja  , Беларускі        Гістарычны Зборнік - Białoruskie Zeszyty        Historyczne nr 18

References

1540s births
1604 deaths
Belarusian writers
Lithuanian writers
Translators of the Bible into Belarusian
Belarusian Unitarians
Lithuanian Unitarians
16th-century Lithuanian nobility
Belarusian printers